DTX may refer to:

Science and technology
 DTX (drum set), an electronic drum line by Yamaha
 DTX (form factor), a computer form factor
 Discontinuous Transmission, in mobile communications
 Dendrotoxin, a class of snake neurotoxin
 .dtx, source files of Documented LaTeX for DocStrip
 Docetaxel, a chemotherapy medication
DTX (Digital Talent Experience), a team composed of Global Talent and IT Employee Experience at ServiceNow

Places
 Downtown Crossing (MBTA station), a station in Boston, USA
 Dallas, a city in the state of Texas

Other
 Yamaha DTX, a variation of Yamaha DT series of Yamaha motorcycles
 Delta Tau Chi, a fictional fraternity in the popular 1978 film Animal House
 DTX (TV channel), a CEEMEA channel owned by Discovery Networks 
 The Downtown Rail Extension in San Francisco, California
 Dövlət Təhlükəsizlik Xidməti(DTX) - state security service of Azerbaijan